Amend: The Fight for America is a 2021 docuseries starring Will Smith, Bryan Stevenson and Larry Wilmore. It covers the legacy of the 14th Amendment to the United States constitution and explores the history of discrimination and activism for equality in the United States.

Cast 
 Will Smith
 Bryan Stevenson
 Larry Wilmore
 Samira Wiley
 Bobby Cannavale
 Laverne Cox
 Graham Greene (actor)
 Randall Park
 Lena Waithe
 Hannah Gadsby
 Mahershala Ali
 Sterling K. Brown
 Joseph Gordon-Levitt
 Joshua Jackson
 Samuel L. Jackson
 Aja Naomi King
 Diane Lane
 Pedro Pascal
 Courtney B. Vance
 Daveed Diggs
 Rafael Casal

Episodes

Release 
Amend: The Fight for America was released on February 17, 2021, on Netflix.

References

External links
 
 

2021 American television series debuts
2021 American television series endings
2020s American documentary television series
Criminal justice reform in the United States
Documentary television series about historical events in the United States
Documentary television series about politics
English-language Netflix original programming
Netflix original documentary television series